The Health Protection Agency Act 2004 (c 17) is an Act of the Parliament of the United Kingdom.

Section 1 – Health Protection Agency
Section 1 (1) provides that there is A body corporate known as the Health Protection Agency, or, in Welsh, Yr Asiantaeth Diogelu Iechyd.

Section 2A – Functions in relation to biological substances
This section was inserted on 1 April 2009 by section 159(3) of the Health and Social Care Act 2008.

Section 12 – Commencement
The Health Protection Agency Act 2004 (Commencement) Order 2005 (S.I. 2005/121 (C. 5)) was made under this section.

Section 12(3) provides that paragraph 3 of Schedule 3 came into force at the end of the period of two months that began on the date on which the Act was passed. The word "months" means calendar months. The day (that is to say, 22 July 2004) on which the Act was passed (that is to say, received royal assent) is included in the period of two months. This means that the paragraph came into force on 22 September 2004.

References
Halsbury's Statutes,

External links
The Health Protection Agency Act 2004, as amended from the National Archives.
The Health Protection Agency Act 2004, as originally enacted from the National Archives.
Explanatory notes to the Health Protection Agency Act 2004.

United Kingdom Acts of Parliament 2004